The 2nd Confederate States Congress, consisting of the Confederate States Senate and the Confederate States House of Representatives, met from May 2, 1864, to March 18, 1865, during the last year of Jefferson Davis's presidency, at the Virginia State Capitol in Richmond, Virginia; the Confederacy's government effectively dissolved 16 days later, when it fled Richmond on April 3, 1865. Its members were elected in the 1863 congressional elections.

Sessions 
Held May 2, 1864, through March 18, 1865, at the Virginia State Capital in Richmond, Virginia. The term of the Second Congress was due to end on February 18, 1866. However, due to the defeat and dissolution of the Confederacy prior to that time, the Congress did not function after the end of its second and final session.
 1st Session – May 2, 1864 to June 14, 1864
 2nd Session – November 7, 1864 to March 18, 1865

Leadership

Senate 

 President: Alexander H. Stephens
 President pro tempore: R. M. T. Hunter

House 

 Speaker: Thomas S. Bocock

Officers

Senate 

 Secretary: James H. Nash, South Carolina
 Recording Clerk: John W. Anderson, Alabama
 Sergeant-at-Arms: Lafayette H. Fitzhugh, Kentucky
 Doorkeeper: James Page, North Carolina
 Assistant Doorkeeper: John Wadsworth, Georgia

House 

 Clerk: Albert Reese Lamar, Georgia
 Assistant Clerk: David Louis Dalton, Alabama — sessions 3 and 4
 Doorkeeper: Robert Harrison Wynne, Alabama

Members

Senate 
X: served in the Senate of the First Congress (i.e. reelected or continued in office for this Second Congress).

Confederate States senators were elected by the state legislatures, or appointed by state governors to fill casual vacancies until the legislature elected a new senator. It was intended that one-third of the Senate would begin new six-year terms with each Congress after the first.

Preceding the names in the list below are Senate class numbers, which indicate the cycle of their terms. Senators of Class 1 were intended to serve a six-year term, starting with this Congress and expiring in 1870. Class 2 senators served what was intended to be a four-year term, due to end on the expiry of this Congress in 1866. Class 3 senators were meant to serve a six-year term, due to expire in 1868.

Alabama
 3. Robert Jemison, Jr. X
 1. Richard Wilde Walker

Arkansas
 1. Robert Ward Johnson X
 3. Charles Burton Mitchel  X (died September 20, 1864)
Augustus Hill Garland (took his seat on  November 8, 1864 – Appointed to fill vacancy)

Florida
 1. James McNair Baker X
 2. Augustus Emmet Maxwell X

Georgia
 3. Benjamin Harvey Hill X
 1. Herschel Vespasian Johnson X

Kentucky
 3. Henry Cornelius Burnett X
 1. William Emmet Simms X

Louisiana
 2. Thomas Jenkins Semmes X
 3. Edward Sparrow X

Mississippi
 2. Albert Gallatin Brown X
 1. John William Clark Watson

Missouri
 2. Waldo Porter Johnson X
 1. (vacant caused by the inability of the Missouri legislature to meet and elect a senator)
George Graham Vest (took his seat on  January 12, 1865 – Appointed to fill vacancy)

North Carolina
 2. William Theophilus Dortch X
 1. William Alexander Graham

South Carolina
 2. Robert Woodward Barnwell X
 3. James Lawrence Orr X

Tennessee
 3. Landon Carter Haynes X
 2. Gustavus Adolphus Henry, Sr. X

Texas
 3. William Simpson Oldham, Sr. X
 2. Louis Trezevant Wigfall X

Virginia
 3. R. M. T. Hunter X
 2. Allen Taylor Caperton X

House of Representatives 
The names of members of the House of Representatives are preceded by their district numbers.

X: reelected

Alabama
 1. Thomas Jefferson Foster X
 2. William Russell Smith X
 3. Congress refused to seat Representative-elect W. R. W. Cobb, an avowed Unionist; the district was not represented;
 4. Marcus Henderson Cruikshank
 5. Francis Strother Lyon X
 6. William Parish Chilton, Sr. X
 7. David Clopton X
 8. James L. Pugh X
 9. James Shelton Dickinson

Arkansas
 1. Felix Ives Batson X
 2. Rufus King Garland, Jr.
 3. Augustus Hill Garland  X (resigned to become CS senator November 8, 1864)
David Williamson Carroll (took his seat on  January 11, 1865 – Elected to fill vacancy on  October 24, 1864)
 4. Thomas Burton Hanly X

Florida
 1. Samuel St. George Rogers
 2. Robert Benjamin Hilton X

Georgia
 1. Julian Hartridge X
 2. William Ephraim Smith
 3. Mark Harden Blandford
 4. Clifford Anderson
 5. John Troup Shewmake
 6. Joseph Hubbard Echols
 7. James Milton Smith
 8. George Nelson Lester
 9. Hiram Parks Bell
 10. Warren Akin, Sr.

Kentucky
 1. Willis Benson Machen X
 2. George Washington Triplett
 3. Henry English Read X
 4. George Washington Ewing X
 5. James Chrisman X
 6. Theodore Legrand Burnett X
 7. Horatio Washington Bruce X
 8. Humphrey Marshall
 9. Eli Metcalfe Bruce X
 10. James William Moore X
 11. Benjamin Franklin Bradley
 12. John Milton Elliott X

Louisiana
 1. Charles Jacques Villeré X
 2. Charles Magill Conrad X
 3. Duncan Farrar Kenner X
 4. Lucius Jacques Dupré X
 5. Benjamin Lewis Hodge (died August 12, 1864)
Henry Gray (took his seat on  December 28, 1864 – Elected to fill vacancy October 17, 1864)
 6. John Perkins, Jr. X

Mississippi
 1. Jehu Amaziah Orr
 2. William Dunbar Holder X
 3. Israel Victor Welch X
 4. Henry Cousins Chambers X
 5. Otho Robards Singleton X
 6. Ethelbert Barksdale X
 7. John Tillman Lamkin

Missouri
In Confederate law, the people of Missouri were entitled to elect thirteen representatives. The state never implemented the reapportionment and continued to use its existing seven districts.
 1. Thomas Lowndes Snead
 2. Nimrod Lindsay Norton
 3. John Bullock Clark, Sr.
 4. Aaron H. Conrow X
 5. George Graham Vest X (resigned January 12, 1865 to become CS senator)
 6. Peter Singleton Wilkes
 7. Robert Anthony Hatcher

North Carolina
 1. William Nathan Harrell Smith X
 2. Robert Rufus Bridgers X
 3. James Thomas Leach
 4. Thomas Charles Fuller
 5. Josiah Turner
 6. John Adams Gilmer
 7. James Madison Leach (Representative-elect Samuel H. Christian died, in March 1864, before taking his seat. Leach was elected April 21, 1864.)
 8. James Graham Ramsay
 9. Burgess Sidney Gaither
 10. George Washington Logan

South Carolina
 1. James Hervey Witherspoon, Jr.
 2. William Porcher Miles X
 3. Lewis Malone Ayer, Jr. X
 4. William Dunlap Simpson X
 5. James Farrow X
 6. William Waters Boyce X

Tennessee
 1. Joseph Brown Heiskell X
 2. William Graham Swan X
 3. Arthur St. Clair Colyar
 4. John Porry Murray
 5. Henry Stuart Foote  X (fled to Canada before completing term)
 6. Edwin Augustus Keebel
 7. James McCallum
 8. Thomas Menees X
 9. John DeWitt Clinton Atkins X
 10. John Vines Wright X
 11. Michael Walsh Cluskey (Representative-elect David Maney Currin died, on March 25, 1864, before taking his seat. Cluskey was elected thereafter.)

Texas
 1. Stephen Heard Darden (Representative-elect John Allen Wilcox died, on February 7, 1864, before taking his seat. Darden was elected August 1864.)
 2. Caleb Claiborne Herbert X
 3. Anthony Martin Branch
 4. Franklin Barlow Sexton X
 5. John Robert Baylor
 6. Simpson Harris Morgan

Virginia
 1. Robert Latane Montague
 2. Robert Henry Whitfield (resigned March 2, 1865)
 3. Williams Carter Wickham
 4. Thomas Saunders Gholson
 5. Thomas Stanley Bocock X
 6. John Goode, Jr. X
 7. William Cabell Rives (resigned March 7, 1865)
 8. Daniel Coleman DeJarnette, Sr. X
 9. David Funsten X
 10. Frederick William Mackey Holliday
 11. John Brown Baldwin X
 12. Waller Redd Staples X
 13. LaFayette McMullen
 14. Samuel Augustine Miller X
 15. Robert Johnston X
 16. Charles Wells Russell X

Delegates 
Non-voting members of the House of Representatives.

Arizona Territory
 Marcus H. MacWillie X

Cherokee Nation
 Elias Cornelius Boudinot X

Creek and Seminole Nations
 Samuel Benton Callahan

Senate committees 
Accounts

 Allen Taylor Caperton, Virginia, Chairman
 William Emmett Simms, Kentucky
 William Theophilus Dortch, North Carolina

Claims

 Henry Cornelius Burnett, Kentucky, Chairman
 James McNair Baker, Florida
 John William Clark Watson, Mississippi — session 2 
 Waldo Porter Johnson, Missouri
 William Simpson Oldham, Sr., Texas — session 2 

Commerce

 William Simpson Oldham, Sr., Texas, Chairman
 Richard Wilde Walker, Alabama
 Augustus Emmett Maxwell, Florida
 William Theophilus Dortch, North Carolina
 Landon Carter Haynes, Sr., Tennessee

Engrossment and Enrollment

 William Theophilus Dortch, North Carolina, Chairman
 Augustus Emmett Maxwell, Florida
 Allen Taylor Caperton, Virginia
 Richard Wilde Walker, Alabama — session 1
 John William Clark Watson, Mississippi — session 1
 Henry Cornelius Burnett, Kentucky — temporary, session 1
 Waldo Porter Johnson, Missouri — temporary, sessions 1 and 2

Finance

 Robert Woodward Barnwell, South Carolina, Chairman
 Thomas Jenkins Semmes, Louisiana
 Robert Mercer Taliaferro Hunter, Virginia
 William Alexander Graham, North Carolina
 Robert Jemison, Jr., Alabama — session 1
 James Lawrence Orr, South Carolina — temporary, session 2
 William Simpson Oldham, Sr., Texas — temporary, session 2 

Foreign Relations

 James Lawrence Orr, South Carolina, Chairman
 William Emmett Simms, Kentucky
 Waldo Porter Johnson, Missouri
 Louis Trezevant Wigfall, Texas
 Allen Taylor Caperton, Virginia

Indian Affairs

 Robert Ward Johnson, Arkansas, Chairman
 Augustus Emmet Maxwell, Florida
 Waldo Porter Johnson, Missouri
 William Simpson Oldham, Sr., Texas
 Allen Taylor Caperton, Virginia

Judiciary

 Benjamin Harvey Hill, Georgia, Chairman
 Richard Wilde Walker, Alabama
 Thomas Jenkins Semmes, Louisiana
 John William Clark Watson, Mississippi
 Landon Carter Haynes, Sr., Tennessee
 William Simpson Oldham, Sr., Texas — temporary, session 2 

Military Affairs

 Edward Sparrow, Louisiana, Chairman
 Robert Ward Johnson, Arkansas
 Henry Cornelius Burnett, Kentucky
 Gustavus Adolphus Henry, Sr., North Carolina
 Louis Trezevant Wigfall, Texas
 Augustus Hill Garland, Arkansas — temporary, session 2

Naval Affairs

 Albert Gallatin Brown, Mississippi, Chairman
 James McNair Baker, Florida
 Herschel Vespasian Johnson, Georgia
 William Emmett Simms, Kentucky
 William Alexander Graham, North Carolina

Patents

 Augustus Emmett Maxwell, Florida, Chairman
 Benjamin Harvey Hill, Georgia
 Landon Carter Haynes, Sr., Tennessee

Post Offices and Post Roads

 Charles Burton Mitchel, Arkansas (died September 20, 1864) — session 1
 James McNair Baker, Florida
 Landon Carter Haynes, Sr., Tennessee
 William Simpson Oldham, Sr., Texas
 Robert Jemison, Jr., Alabama — session 1
 Augustus Hill Garland, Arkansas — session 2
 Richard Wilde Walker, Alabama — temporary, session 2
 Allen Taylor Caperton, Virginia — temporary, session 2

Printing

 John William Clark Watson, Mississippi, Chairman
 James Lawrence Orr, South Carolina
 Landon Carter Haynes, Sr., Tennessee

Public Buildings

 Richard Wilde Walker, Alabama
 James McNair Baker, Florida
 William Emmett Simms, Kentucky

Public Lands

 James McNair Baker, Florida, Chairman
 Robert Ward Johnson, Arkansas
 Gustavus Adolphus Henry, Sr., North Carolina

Rules

 James Lawrence Orr, South Carolina, Chairman
 Robert Ward Johnson, Arkansas
 Thomas Jenkins Semmes, Louisiana

Territories

 Louis Trezevant Wigfall, Texas, Chairman
 Charles Burton Mitchel, Arkansas (died September 20, 1864) — session 1
 Robert Woodward Barnwell, South Carolina

House committees 
Accounts

John Troup Shewmake, 5th Georgia
Israel Victor Welch, 3rd Mississippi
James Farrow, 5th South Carolina
James McCallum, 7th Tennessee
Robert Johnston, 15th Virginia

Claims

 James Shelton Dickinson, 9th Alabama
 Warren Akin, Sr., 10th Georgia
 George Washington Triplett, 2nd Kentucky
 Israel Victor Welch, 3rd Mississippi
 William Nathan Harrell Smith, 1st North Carolina
 James Farrow, 5th South Carolina
 Joseph Brown Heiskell, 1st Tennessee
 Frederick William Mackey Holliday, 10th Virginia
 George Washington Ewing, 4th Kentucky — session 2
 Nimrod Lindsay Norton, 2nd Missouri — session 2
 Caleb Claiborne Herbert, 2nd Texas — session 2

Commerce

 James Shelton Dickinson, 9th Alabama
 Julian Hartridge, 1st Georgia
 Theodore Legrand Burnett, 6th Kentucky
 John Perkins, Jr., 6th Louisiana
 John Tillman Lamkin, 7th Mississippi
 Thomas Charles Fuller, 4th North Carolina
 James Farrow, 5th South Carolina
 John DeWitt Clinton Atkins, 9th Tennessee
 John Goode, Jr., 6th Virginia
 Lewis Malone Ayer, Jr., 3rd South Carolina — session 2
 David Williamson Carroll, 3rd Arkansas — session 2
 Caleb Claiborne Herbert, 2nd Texas — session 2

Elections

 Robert Benjamin Hilton, 2nd Florida
 Hiram Parks Bell, 9th Georgia
 James Chrisman, 5th Kentucky
 William Dunbar Holder, 2nd Mississippi
 John Adams Gilmer, 6th North Carolina
 William Dunlap Simpson, 4th South Carolina
 Joseph Brown Heiskell, 1st Tennessee
 Anthony Martin Branch, 3rd Texas
 Samuel Augustine Miller, 14th Virginia
 John Bullock Clark, Sr., 3rd Missouri — session 2

Enrolled Bills

 Marcus Henderson Cruikshank, 4th Alabama
 Samuel St. George Rogers, 1st Florida
 Thomas Charles Fuller, 4th North Carolina
 Robert Anthony Hatcher, 7th Missouri — temporary, session 2

Flag and Seal

 William Parish Chilton, Sr., 6th Alabama
 Henry Cousins Chambers, 4th Mississippi
 William Cabell Rives, 7th Virginia (resigned March 7, 1865)
 David Funsten, 9th Virginia — temporary, session 2

Foreign Affairs

 Henry Stuart Foote, 5th Tennessee, Chairman (fled to Canada before completing term)
 William Russell Smith, 2nd Alabama
 Horatio Washington Bruce, 7th Kentucky
 John Perkins, Jr., 6th Louisiana
 Jehu Amaziah Orr, 1st Mississippi
 Josiah Turner, 5th North Carolina
 James Hervey Witherspoon, Jr., 1st South Carolina
 Daniel Coleman DeJarnette, Sr., 8th Virginia
 William Cabell Rives, 7th Virginia (resigned March 7, 1865)
 John DeWitt Clinton Atkins, 9th Tennessee — session 2
 Thomas Lowndes Snead, 1st Missouri — session 2

Indian Affairs

 Otho Robards Singleton, 5th Mississippi, Chairman — session 1
 Thomas Jefferson Foster, 1st Alabama
 Thomas Burton Hanly, 4th Arkansas
 Samuel St. George Rogers, 1st Florida
 Joseph Hubbard Echols, 6th Georgia
 James Chrisman, 5th Kentucky
 Josiah Turner, 5th North Carolina
 John Porry Murray, 4th Tennessee
 Samuel Augustine Miller, 14th Virginia
 Elias Cornelius Boudinot, Cherokee Nation
 John Robert Baylor, 5th Texas — session 2
 Peter Singleton Wilkes, 6th Missouri — session 2
 John Milton Elliott, 12th Kentucky — session 2

Judiciary

 William Parish Chilton, Sr., 6th Alabama
 Mark Harden Blandford, 3rd Georgia
 James William Moore, 10th Kentucky
 Lucius Jacques Dupré, 4th Louisiana
 Burgess Sidney Gaither, 9th North Carolina
 Edwin Augustus Keebel, 6th Tennessee
 Thomas Saunders Gholson, 4th Virginia
 Charles Wells Russell, 16th Virginia
 Augustus Hill Garland, 3rd Arkansas (resigned to become CS senator November 8, 1864) — session 1
 Simpson Harris Morgan, 6th Texas (died December 15, 1864) — session 2
 Felix Ives Batson, 1st Arkansas — session 2
 Henry Gray, 5th Louisiana — session 2
 George Graham Vest, 5th Missouri — session 2

Medical Department

 David Clopton, 7th Alabama
 Joseph Hubbard Echols, 6th Georgia
 Henry English Read, 3rd Kentucky
 William Dunbar Holder, 2nd Mississippi
 James Graham Ramsay, 8th North Carolina
 James Farrow, 5th South Carolina
 James McCallum, 7th Tennessee
 Thomas Menees, 8th Tennessee
 Daniel Coleman DeJarnette, Sr., 8th Virginia

Military Affairs

 William Porcher Miles, 2nd South Carolina, Chairman
 James Lawrence Pugh, 8th Alabama
 Thomas Burton Hanly, 4th Arkansas
 Robert Benjamin Hilton, 2nd Florida
 James Milton Smith, 7th Georgia
 Humphrey Marshall, 8th Kentucky
 Charles Jacques Villeré, 1st Louisiana
 Henry Cousins Chambers, 4th Mississippi
 Robert Rufus Bridgers, 2nd North Carolina
 William Graham Swan, 2nd Tennessee
 Anthony Martin Branch, 3rd Texas
 Waller Redd Staples, 12th Virginia
 John Bullock Clark, Sr., 3rd Missouri — session 2
 Williams Carter Wickham, 3rd Virginia — session 2

Naval Affairs

 David Clopton, 7th Alabama, Chairman
 Samuel St. George Rogers, 1st Florida
 John Troup Shewmake, 5th Georgia
 William Dunbar Holder, 2nd Mississippi
 James Graham Ramsay, 8th North Carolina
 William Waters Boyce, 6th South Carolina
 John Vines Wright, 10th Tennessee
 David Funsten, 9th Virginia
 Robert Henry Whitfield, 2nd Virginia (resigned March 2, 1865)
 Michael Walsh Cluskey, 11th Tennessee — session 2
 Stephen Heard Darden, 1st Texas — session 2

Ordnance and Ordnance Stores

 Marcus Henderson Cruikshank, 4th Alabama
 William Ephraim Smith, 2nd Georgia
 Benjamin Franklin Bradley, 11th Kentucky
 Ethelbert Barksdale, 6th Mississippi
 George Washington Logan, 10th North Carolina
 James Hervey Witherspoon, Jr., 1st South Carolina
 John Porry Murray, 4th Tennessee
 John DeWitt Clinton Atkins, 9th Tennessee
 Robert Latané Montague, 1st Virginia
 Robert Anthony Hatcher, 7th Missouri — session 2
 Lewis Malone Ayer, Jr., 3rd South Carolina — session 2

Patents

 William Parish Chilton, Sr., 6th Alabama, Chairman
 Hiram Parks Bell, 9th Georgia
 Horatio Washington Bruce, 7th Kentucky
 John Tillman Lamkin, 7th Mississippi
 Thomas Charles Fuller, 4th North Carolina
 Joseph Brown Heiskell, 1st Tennessee
 Robert Henry Whitfield, 2nd Virginia (resigned March 2, 1865)
 John Robert Baylor, 5th Texas — session 2

Pay and Mileage

 Theodore Legrand Burnett, 6th Kentucky, Chairman
 Thomas Burton Hanly, 4th Arkansas
 Joseph Hubbard Echols, 6th Georgia
 Mark Harden Blandford, 3rd Georgia — temporary, session 2

Post Offices and Post Roads

 Thomas Jefferson Foster, 1st Alabama
 Hiram Parks Bell, 9th Georgia
 Benjamin Franklin Bradley, 11th Kentucky
 John Tillman Lamkin, 7th Mississippi
 James Thomas Leach, 3rd North Carolina
 James Hervey Witherspoon, Jr., 1st South Carolina
 James McCallum, 7th Tennessee
 Franklin Barlow Sexton, 4th Texas
 LaFayette McMullen, 13th Virginia
 John Milton Elliott, 12th Kentucky — session 2
 Peter Singleton Wilkes, 6th Missouri — session 2

Printing

 Lucius Jacques Dupré, 4th Louisiana, Chairman
 Marcus Henderson Cruikshank, 4th Alabama
 George Washington Logan, 10th North Carolina
 William Graham Swan, 2nd Tennessee
 John Goode, Jr., 6th Virginia

Public Buildings

 James Lawrence Pugh, 8th Alabama, Chairman
 Charles Magill Conrad, 2nd Louisiana
 LaFayette McMullen, 13th Virginia
 William Dunbar Holder, 2nd Mississippi — session 2
 Aaron H. Conrow, 4th Missouri — session 2

Quartermaster's and Commissary Departments and Military Transportation 

 George Nelson Lester, 8th Georgia
 Willis Benson Machen, 1st Kentucky
 Henry English Read, 3rd Kentucky
 Jehu Amaziah Orr, 1st Mississippi
 James Madison Leach, 7th North Carolina (elected April 21, 1864)
 William Dunlap Simpson, 4th South Carolina
 Henry Stuart Foote, 5th Tennessee (fled to Canada before completing term)
 Frederick William Mackey Holliday, 10th Virginia
 Robert Johnston, 15th Virginia
 Aaron H. Conrow, 4th Missouri — session 2

Rules and Officers of the House

 William Parish Chilton, Sr., 6th Alabama
 George Nelson Lester, 8th Georgia
 John Perkins, Jr., 6th Louisiana
 William Nathan Harrell Smith, 1st North Carolina
 Robert Latané Montague, 1st Virginia

Territories and Public Lands

 Thomas Jefferson Foster, 1st Alabama
 Robert Benjamin Hilton, 2nd Florida
 William Ephraim Smith, 2nd Georgia
 James Chrisman, 5th Kentucky
 James Thomas Leach, 3rd North Carolina
 Thomas Menees, 8th Tennessee
 Anthony Martin Branch, 3rd Texas
 LaFayette McMullen, 13th Virginia
 Augustus Hill Garland, 3rd Arkansas (resigned to become CS senator November 8, 1864) — session 1
 George Washington Ewing, 4th Kentucky — session 2
 Nimrod Lindsay Norton, 2nd Missouri — session 2

Ways and Means

 Francis Strother Lyon, 5th Alabama, Chairman
 Clifford Anderson, 4th Georgia
 Eli Metcalfe Bruce, 9th Kentucky
 Charles Magill Conrad, 2nd Louisiana
 Ethelbert Barksdale, 6th Mississippi
 John Adams Gilmer, 6th North Carolina
 Arthur St. Clair Colyar, 3rd Tennessee
 Franklin Barlow Sexton, 4th Texas
 John Brown Baldwin, 11th Virginia
 Duncan Farrar Kenner, 3rd Louisiana — session 2
 Rufus King Garland, Jr., 2nd Arkansas — session 2

Joint committees 
Impressments (Session 1)

 Senators
John William Clark Watson, Mississippi
William Alexander Graham, North Carolina
Robert Woodward Barnwell, South Carolina
Representatives
William Parish Chilton, Sr., 6th Alabama
Thomas Burton Hanly, 4th Arkansas
Julian Hartridge, 1st Georgia
Henry Cousins Chambers, 4th Mississippi
John Brown Baldwin, 11th Virginia

Notes

References 
 The Historical Atlas of the Congresses of the Confederate States of America: 1861–1865, by Kenneth C. Martis (Simon and Schuster 1994)

 
1864 establishments in Virginia
Military units and formations established in 1864
1865 disestablishments in Virginia